Ayush Jamwal (born 11 August 1999) is an Indian cricketer. He made his List A debut for Himachal Pradesh in the 2017–18 Vijay Hazare Trophy on 5 February 2018. He made his Twenty20 debut for Himachal Pradesh in the 2018–19 Syed Mushtaq Ali Trophy on 21 February 2019.

References

External links
 

1999 births
Living people
Dogra people
Indian Hindus
Indian cricketers
Place of birth missing (living people)
Himachal Pradesh cricketers